Anderida sonorella is a species of snout moth described by Émile Louis Ragonot in 1887. It is found in North America, including Arizona.

References

Moths described in 1887
Phycitinae
Moths of North America